Astalon: Tears of the Earth is a 2021 video game by LABS Works, published by Japanese publisher Dangen Entertainment. The game's plot revolves around a fighter named Arias, an archer named Kyuli, and a wizard named Algus. The three are on a quest to save their home village from despair as most of the land has turned to desert from the atrocities of an ancient war.

Gameplay
Astalon: Tears of The Earth is an action-platformer and Metroidvania game. The player can switch freely between three characters to use the unique abilities of a warrior, archer and wizard to explore a giant tower and defeat the Gorgons that inhabit it.

Development
Astalon: Tears of The Earth began development in 2016 but was a project that was re-started several times during production. Art and Game Designer Matt Kap was joined in 2018 by Game Programmer Jon Lepage to work on the game together up until the very end. Game developer Matt Kap stated that the first prototype had room-by-room exploration with only one playable character. The second prototype introduced the 3 characters while the third prototype was closer to the completed game.

Reception

Astalon: Tears of the Earth was released on June 3, 2021 on Steam, GOG, Itch.io, Xbox One, PlayStation 4, Playstation 5, and Nintendo Switch. It was named as the best Metroidvania game of 2021 by PC Gamer.

On January 21, 2022, Limited Run Games released physical and collector editions of Astalon: Tears of the Earth for Nintendo Switch and Playstation 4. All versions sold out.

References

2021 video games
Fantasy video games
Fictional knights in video games
Indie video games
Metroidvania games
Nintendo Switch games
PlayStation 4 games
Single-player video games
Video games developed in Japan
Windows games
Xbox Cloud Gaming games
Xbox One games
Retro-style video games